St. Stephen is a town in Berkeley County, South Carolina, United States. The population was 1,697 at the 2010 census.

St. Stephen is included within the Charleston-North Charleston-Summerville metropolitan area.

History
The Keller Site and St. Stephen's Episcopal Church are listed on the National Register of Historic Places.

Geography
St. Stephen is located in northern Berkeley County at  (33.405024, -79.923365), between Lake Moultrie to the west and the Santee River to the northeast. The town lies along the western edge of Francis Marion National Forest near its northernmost point.

U.S. Route 52 runs through the center of the town, leading north  to Kingstree and south  to Moncks Corner, the Berkeley County seat. South Carolina Highway 45 crosses US 52 in the town center and leads west  to Eutawville and southeast  to McClellanville near the Atlantic Ocean.

Demographics

2020 census

As of the 2020 United States census, there were 1,571 people, 648 households, and 397 families residing in the town.

2000 census
As of the census of 2000, there were 1,776 people, 640 households, and 453 families residing in the town. The racial makeup of the town was 58.22% African American, 39.92% White, 0.17% Native American, 0.11% Asian, 0.06% Pacific Islander, 0.90% from other races, and 0.62% from two or more races. Hispanic or Latino of any race were 1.52% of the population.

There were 640 households, out of which 37.7% had children under the age of 18 living with them, 40.0% were married couples living together, 27.0% had a female householder with no husband present, and 29.2% were non-families. 26.7% of all households were made up of individuals, and 10.5% had someone living alone who was 65 years of age or older. The average household size was 2.65 and the average family size was 3.19.

In the town, the population was spread out, with 32.8% under the age of 18, 8.7% from 18 to 24, 22.2% from 25 to 44, 21.1% from 45 to 64, and 15.2% who were 65 years of age or older. The median age was 32 years. For every 100 females, there were 80.9 males. For every 100 females age 18 and over, there were 68.2 males.

The median income for a household in the town was $20,804, and the median income for a family was $25,750. Males had a median income of $30,461 versus $17,784 for females. The per capita income for the town was $11,258. About 34.6% of families and 38.9% of the population were below the poverty line, including 55.7% of those under age 18 and 14.3% of those age 65 or over.

Education
St. Stephen has a public library, a branch of the Berkeley County Library System.

References

External links
 St. Stephen Visitor Center

Towns in Berkeley County, South Carolina
Towns in South Carolina
Charleston–North Charleston–Summerville metropolitan area
Populated places established in 1754
1754 establishments in South Carolina